is a national park in the Chūgoku region, Honshū, Japan, and spans the prefectures of Okayama, Shimane, and Tottori. Mount Daisen is the focus of the park, which also includes the volcanic mountains and plains of Hiruzen, Mount Kenashi, Mount Sanbe, and Mount Hōbutsu. The Izumo Plain region of the park is home to the oldest Shinto shrine in Japan, the Izumo-taisha. The Oki Islands are also an important component of the park.

See also
List of national parks of Japan

External links

Introducing places of interest: Daisen-Oki National Park
Daisen-Oki National Park
Daisen-Oki National Park

References

National parks of Japan
Parks and gardens in Okayama Prefecture
Parks and gardens in Shimane Prefecture
Parks and gardens in Tottori Prefecture
Protected areas established in 1936